Mahaiyawa is a village in Sri Lanka. It is located within Central Province.

See also
List of towns in Central Province, Sri Lanka
Mahaiyawa belongs to Kandy district

External links

Populated places in Kandy District